Silvio Longobucco (5 June 1951 – 2 April 2022) was an Italian professional footballer who played as a defender.

Honours
Juventus
 Serie A: 1971–72, 1972–73, 1974–75

References

1951 births
2022 deaths
Sportspeople from Cosenza
Italian footballers
Association football defenders
Serie A players
Ternana Calcio players
Juventus F.C. players
Cagliari Calcio players
Cosenza Calcio 1914 players
Footballers from Calabria